1ES 2344+514 is a blazar first detected on December 20, 1995 with its official discovery being announced in 1998. It is more than 5 billion light years away from Earth. It was discovered by the Whipple Collaboration at the Whipple Observatory using a 10 meter gamma-ray telescope.

References 

Blazars
Cassiopeia (constellation)